Putt-Putt is a series of children's adventure and puzzle computer games created by Humongous Entertainment. This franchise was Humongous Entertainment's first game series to be developed. They primarily involve clicking to get to a destination, although some sub-quests and mini-games involve the keyboard. The main character, Putt-Putt, an anthropomorphic purple convertible, and his dog, Pep, travel to various locations.

History
Putt-Putt was originally thought up by Shelley Day as a series of bedtime stories for her son, Travis; the first story involved Putt-Putt saving a cat caught in a tree. Child actor Jason Ellefson did Putt-Putt's voice for the first eight of the games. In the next three games, Nancy Cartwright (of The Simpsons fame) voiced Putt-Putt. Michelle Thorson voiced Putt-Putt in Pep's Birthday Surprise.

The games are supported by ScummVM and thus can be played on other platforms such as handhelds. Humongous has brought several Putt-Putt and other titles to iOS and Android.

In 1997, Humongous made an agreement with Lancit Media Entertainment to create an animated TV series of Putt-Putt, planned for premiere in the fall of 1998, along with movies and home video releases. It was later planned to premiere somewhere in 2000 under the title, "Putt-Putt 'n Pals". Ultimately, the deal fell through.

Several games from the original series were later re-released by Humongous on Steam in April 2014, alongside games from the Pajama Sam, Freddi Fish, and Spy Fox series. The first two games used pixel art graphics; starting with the third game, the series uses hand-drawn animation.

Games

Adventure games
Humongous Entertainment classified these games as Junior Adventures (for kids 3–8):
 Putt-Putt Joins the Parade (September 9, 1992)
 Putt-Putt Goes to the Moon (October 1, 1993)
 Putt-Putt Saves the Zoo (August 10, 1995)
 Putt-Putt Travels Through Time (June 1, 1997)
 Putt-Putt Enters the Race (January 14, 1999)
 Putt-Putt Joins the Circus (June 16, 2000)
 Putt-Putt: Pep's Birthday Surprise (September 16, 2003)

Other games

Customization
Players can change Putt-Putt's color to original purple, red, orange, yellow, green or blue. All colors can be painted on again. This also changes the color of the dashboard in Putt-Putt Enters the Race and Putt-Putt Joins the Circus. However, in Putt-Putt Joins the Parade and Putt-Putt Enters the Race, each color change costs three coins that can be collected in the game world. In Putt-Putt: Pep's Birthday Surprise, Putt-Putt's color can only be changed temporarily before reverting to purple after some traveling. His color can also be changed in certain levels of Putt-Putt and Pep's Balloon-o-Rama by using Pep to pop certain balloons tied to paint buckets, then catching the bucket containing the desired color as it falls to change Putt-Putt to.

Availability
 For Steam the games were released as single games, or bundled together in the "Putt-Putt Complete Pack" or came packaged with all Humongous Entertainment games in "Humongous Entertainment Complete Pack".
 Humongous Entertainment released a CD titled "Humongous Entertainment Triple Treat", which included Putt-Putt Saves the Zoo, Pajama Sam's Sock Works and Freddi Fish and the Case of the Missing Kelp Seeds.
 Humongous Entertainment released a CD titled "Humongous Entertainment Triple Treat 2", which included Putt Putt Travels Through Time, Pajama Sam: No Need to Hide When It's Dark Outside and Freddi Fish and Luther's Maze Madness.
 Humongous Entertainment released a "Putt-Putt Fun & Learning Kindergarten Edition" package with a Putt-Putt notebook and a CD that included Putt-Putt Saves the Zoo and Big Thinkers Kindergarten.
 Putt-Putt and Pep's Balloon-O-Rama was released for Windows and Macintosh on a compilation CD titled "Super Duper Arcade 1", along with Spy Fox in: Cheese Chase, Pajama Sam's Sock Works and Freddi Fish and Luther's Water Worries.
 Putt-Putt and Pep's Dog on a Stick was released for Windows and Macintosh on a compilation CD titled "Super Duper Arcade 2", along with Spy Fox in: Hold the Mustard, Pajama Sam's Lost & Found and Freddi Fish and Luther's Maze Madness.
 Putt-Putt Travels Through Time was released on the Nintendo Switch eShop alongside Freddi Fish 3: The Case of the Stolen Conch Shell in January 2022. The next month, Putt-Putt Saves the Zoo was released alongside Pajama Sam: No Need to Hide When It's Dark Outside, Pajama Sam: Thunder and Lightning Aren't so Frightening, and Spy Fox in Dry Cereal.

Books
Various children's books about Putt-Putt have been published by Lyrick Publishing and Random House. A cassette tape audio adaptation was created for "Putt-Putt's Night Before Christmas".

Reception
The Putt-Putt series received various awards including "All-Star Software Award" from Children's Software Revue, "Reader's Choice Award" from Mac Home Journal and "2000 Best Picks Award" from Choosing Children's Software.

References

External links
 Putt-Putt at Humongous Entertainment
 

Children's educational video games
Humongous Entertainment games
Video game franchises
Fictional cars
Video games about dogs
Video games about birthdays
Works about friendship
Video games developed in the United States
Video game franchises introduced in 1992